Wishbone Ash is the first studio album by Wishbone Ash. It peaked at number 29 in the UK Albums Chart in January 1971.

Background
The band opened for Deep Purple in early 1970. Deep Purple guitarist Ritchie Blackmore was jamming during the band's soundcheck, when Wishbone guitarist Andy Powell joined in and began jamming with Blackmore. After the show, Blackmore recommended that MCA Records sign the band. Deep Purple producer Derek Lawrence produced this album, which features elements of blues, jazz, progressive rock, and psychedelic improvisation.. The first side contained three uptempo tracks along with the ballad "Errors Of My Way" which, unusually for a rock song, was written in 12/8 time. Side two contained two lengthy tracks featuring long instrumental passages, the second of which, Phoenix, was to become a live favourite often stretching in excess of 17 minutes.

Track listing

"Blind Eye" and "Queen of Torture" were released on 7" single, MCA MK5061 (Decca 32826 in US) (February 1971)

Personnel
Wishbone Ash
Andy Powell - lead guitar, vocals
Ted Turner - lead guitar, vocals
Martin Turner - bass, vocals
Steve Upton - drums
Guest appearance
Matthew Fisher - piano

Charts

References

Wishbone Ash albums
Albums produced by Derek Lawrence
MCA Records albums
1970 debut albums
Decca Records albums